Dobromilice is a municipality and village in Prostějov District in the Olomouc Region of the Czech Republic. It has about 800 inhabitants.

Notable people
Antonín Novotný (1827–1871), chess composer
Karl Michael von Levetzow (1871–1945), German poet and librettist

References

Villages in Prostějov District